Ubukata (written: 冲方) is a Japanese surname. Notable people with the surname include:

, Japanese footballer
, Japanese novelist and screenwriter

Japanese-language surnames